Kanta Nalawade was a member of Maharashtra Legislative Council and a member of Bharatiya Janata Party.
She is Vice President of the state unit of the party and a member of national working committee.  She started her career as a party worker in the Jan Sangh together with her husband Jaisinghrao Nalawade and became the BJP's national secretary in 2000. She comes from a farmers' family in Arale village in Satara.

References

Members of the Maharashtra Legislative Council
Living people
Women in Maharashtra politics
Marathi politicians
Bharatiya Jana Sangh politicians
Bharatiya Janata Party politicians from Maharashtra
20th-century Indian women politicians
20th-century Indian politicians
People from Baramati
Year of birth missing (living people)